Justinas Staugaitis (14 November 1866 near Šakiai – 8 July 1943, Telšiai) was a Lithuanian Roman Catholic bishop, politician, educator, and author. He was one of the twenty signatories to the Act of Independence of Lithuania.

Staugaitis graduated from the Sejny Theological Seminary and was ordained in 1890. At that time, the use of the written Lithuanian language was prohibited, and his cousin Antanas Saugaitis participated in the underground movements that smuggled in such books and periodicals (see Knygnešiai). He then served as a curate in a number of parishes in Lithuania and Poland.

In Marijampolė, he founded the educational Žiburys Society, and was instrumental in founding several schools, an old age home, and an orphanage. From 1909 to 1912 he served on the editorial staff of the periodical Vadovas (The Guide). At the Vilnius Conference in 1917, he was elected to the Council of Lithuania, and signed the Act of Independence in 1918.

As a member of the Christian Democratic Party, he was elected to the Constituent Assembly in 1920, serving alternately as speaker or deputy speaker. He was the speaker of Seimas from 1923 to 1925.

In 1926 Staugaitis was consecrated Bishop of Telšiai, a newly formed diocese in northwestern Lithuania that had been part of the Samogitian diocese. He established a theological seminary in Telšiai and contributed numerous articles to periodicals, as well as writing several books. These included a history of the church, a history of the Lithuanian State Council, and a novel depicting the life of a loyal priest.

Appeals by Jews to bishop Staugaitis to stop their persecution by the Lithuanian Activist Front during the Holocaust in Telšiai were rebuffed by the bishop who told the Jews that "This is what you deserve for bringing the Bolsheviks to Lithuania", this despite the persecution of religious Jews during Soviet rule.

References

 Staugaitis, Justinas. Encyclopedia Lituanica V: 299. (1970-1978). Ed. Simas Sužiedėlis. Boston, Massachusetts: Juozas Kapočius. LCCN 74-114275.

|-
 

|-
 

1866 births
1943 deaths
20th-century Roman Catholic bishops in Lithuania
20th-century Lithuanian historians
Lithuanian book smugglers
Members of the Council of Lithuania
Speakers of the Seimas
People from Marijampolė County
Lithuanian independence activists